Hondor or Hanadar may refer to:
Hondor, Lorestan